Ferhat Arıcan (born 28 July 1993) is a Turkish male artistic gymnast.  He represented Turkey at the 2016 and 2020 Olympic Games.  At the 2020 Olympic Games he became the first Turkish gymnast to win an Olympic medal, winning bronze on the parallel bars.

Personal life 
Arıcan was born in Konak, İzmir in 1993.  He took up gymnastics when he was 9–10 years old. He studied sports administration at Ege University.

Gymnastics career

2010 
Arıcan was selected to represent Turkey at the inaugural Youth Olympic Games.  He won silver on vault behind Ganbatyn Erdenebold of Mongolia.

2014 
Arıcan competed at the 2014 World Artistic Gymnastics Championships in Nanning, China.  He was originally a reserve athlete for the all-around; however he was called up to compete when Alexander Shatilov withdrew.  He placed twenty-third.

2015 
At the European Championships Arıcan placed 24th in the all-around and seventh on parallel bars.  At the European Games he placed eleventh in the all-around and sixth on vault and parallel bars.  At the World Championships he placed 53rd in the all-around during qualifications.

2016 
Arıcan competed at the Olympic Test Event where he earned an individual berth to compete at the upcoming Olympic Games.  In doing so he became the first Turkish male gymnast in 108 to qualify to compete at the Olympics after Aleko Mulos did so in 1908.  At the Olympic Games Arıcan placed 41st in the all-around during qualifications and did not qualify for any event finals.

2017 
At the European Championships Arıcan placed eighth in the all-around and on pommel horse and placed seventh on the parallel bars.  He competed at the Islamic Solidarity Games alongside Ahmet Önder and İbrahim Çolak; they finished first as a team.  Individually Arıcan placed first on parallel bars and second on horizontal bar.  At the World Championships Arıcan placed twentieth in the all-around and also qualified to his first apparatus event final, the parallel bars.  He finished eighth on the event.

2018 
Arıcan competed at the World Cups in Baku and Doha and the World Challenge Cups in Koper and Mersin; he earned five bronze medals.  At the Mediterranean Games he helped Turkey place second as a team and individually he won bronze on the parallel bars.  Arıcan placed nineteenth in the all-around at the World Championships.

2019 
Arıcan competed at the World Cups in Melbourne, Baku, and Doha.  At the European Championships He placed tenth in the all-around and fifth on pommel horse but won his first European medal, a bronze on parallel bars.  Arıcan next competed at the European Games where he won another bronze on parallel bars.  At the World Championships that year he placed fifth on the event.

2020 
Arıcan competed at the Baku World Cup; however the competition was canceled after qualifications due to the COVID-19 pandemic.  Many other competitions were either canceled or postponed throughout the year.  In December the European Championships were held.  Arıcan helped Turkey win the silver medal behind Ukraine in the team competition.  Individually Arıcan won gold on the parallel bars and silver on pommel horse.

2021 
Arıcan defended his parallel bars title at the European Championships.  He also picked up gold medals on the apparatus at the Osijek Challenge Cup and the Doha World Cup.

Arıcan competed at the 2020 Olympic Games in Tokyo.  He won the bronze medal on the parallel bars behind Zou Jingyuan and Lukas Dauser. With this medal he became the first athlete representing Turkey to earn an Olympic Medal in artistic gymnastics.

2022 

Arıcan began the year competing at the World Cups in Cottbus, Cairo, and Baku and the World Challenge Cup in Osijek; he earned one gold medal and two silver medals on the parallel bars.  He competed at the Mediterranean Games where he helped Turkey win gold in the team competition.  Additionally he won gold on parallel bars and bronze on pommel horse.  Arıcan next competed at the Islamic Solidarity Games alongside Adem Asil and Ahmet Önder; together they won gold as a team.  Individually Arıcan once again won gold on parallel bars and bronze on pommel horse.  He next competed at the European Championships where he helped Turkey win team bronze behind Great Britain and Italy.  Individually Arıcan placed fifth on pommel horse and seventh on the parallel bars.

Competitive history

References

External links 
 

1993 births
Living people
Turkish male artistic gymnasts
Gymnasts at the 2010 Summer Youth Olympics
Gymnasts at the 2016 Summer Olympics
Olympic gymnasts of Turkey
Competitors at the 2013 Mediterranean Games
Competitors at the 2018 Mediterranean Games
Gymnasts at the 2022 Mediterranean Games
Mediterranean Games bronze medalists for Turkey
Mediterranean Games silver medalists for Turkey
Mediterranean Games gold medalists for Turkey
Mediterranean Games medalists in gymnastics
Gymnasts at the 2015 European Games
Gymnasts at the 2019 European Games
European Games medalists in gymnastics
European Games bronze medalists for Turkey
European champions in gymnastics
Gymnasts at the 2020 Summer Olympics
Medalists at the 2020 Summer Olympics
Olympic bronze medalists for Turkey
Olympic medalists in gymnastics